The central leaf-eared mouse (Graomys chacoensis) is a species of rodent in the family Cricetidae. It is known only from central Argentina. Prior to 1994, it was considered a subspecies of G. griseoflavus. Then referred to as G. centralis, as of 2019 it was referred to as G. chacoensis by the IUCN.

References

Mammals of Argentina
Graomys
Mammals described in 1902